Michael Clendenin (1934 – December 12, 2017) was an American journalist. He was the editor of the New York Daily News when it won the Pulitzer Prize for investigative reporting in 1974.

References

1934 births
2017 deaths
American male journalists
20th-century American journalists
21st-century American journalists
Journalists from Indiana